Yukina Hirayama (born 19 December 1995) is a Japanese swimmer. She competed in the women's 50 metre butterfly event at the 2018 FINA World Swimming Championships (25 m), in Hangzhou, China.

References

External links
 

1995 births
Living people
Japanese female butterfly swimmers
Place of birth missing (living people)
Universiade medalists in swimming
21st-century Japanese women
Universiade gold medalists for Japan
Universiade bronze medalists for Japan
Medalists at the 2017 Summer Universiade